Max Schautzer (born 14 August 1940 in Klagenfurt) is an Austrian-born German radio and television presenter.

Schautzer was born in Klagenfurt and studied Drama and Economics in Vienna. In 1965, he left for Germany and began working for the regional broadcaster Westdeutscher Rundfunk. He has been known for hosting the show Spaß muß sein with Hans Rosenthal, Die schönsten Melodien der Welt with Carolin Reiber, Immer wieder sonntags and Alles oder nichts. He also commentated on the Eurovision Song Contest for both German and Austrian viewers: 1979 for Austria and 1991 for Germany. In 1990 he was awarded a Bambi.

Since 2004 he has hosted the show Immer wieder Sonntags; he also represented WDR at the NDR-Elf.

External links
 Website von Max Schautzer
 Max Schautzer auf der Website des MDR

1940 births
Mass media people from Klagenfurt
Living people
German television personalities
German radio personalities
German game show hosts
German television talk show hosts
ARD (broadcaster) people
Westdeutscher Rundfunk people